Oded Regev (Hebrew: עודד רגב) is an Israeli-American theoretical computer scientist and mathematician. He is a professor of computer science at the Courant institute at New York University. He is best known for his work in lattice-based cryptography, and in particular for introducing the learning with errors problem.

Biography 

Oded Regev earned his B.Sc. in 1995, M.Sc. in 1997, and Ph.D. in 2001, all from Tel Aviv University. He completed his Ph.D. at the age of 21, advised by Yossi Azar, with a thesis titled "Scheduling and Load Balancing." He held faculty positions at Tel Aviv University and the École Normale Supérieure before joining the Courant institute.

Work 
Regev has done extensive work on lattices. He is best known for introducing the learning with errors problem (LWE), for which he won the 2018 Gödel Prize. As the citation reads:
Regev’s work has ushered in a revolution in cryptography, in both theory and practice. On the theoretical side, LWE has served as a simple and yet amazingly versatile foundation for nearly every kind of cryptographic object imaginable—along with many that were unimaginable until recently, and which still have no known constructions without LWE. Toward the practical end, LWE and its direct descendants are at the heart of several efficient real-world cryptosystems.
Regev's most influential other work on lattices includes cryptanalysis of the GGH and NTRU signature schemes in joint work with Phong Q. Nguyen, for which they won a best paper award at Eurocrypt 2006; introducing the ring learning with errors problem in joint work with Chris Peikert and Vadim Lyubashevsky; and proving a converse to Minkowski's theorem and exploring its applications in joint works with his student Noah Stephens-Davidowitz and his former postdoc Daniel Dadush.

In addition to his work on lattices, Regev has also done work in a large number of other areas in theoretical computer science and mathematics. These include quantum computing, communication complexity, hardness of approximation, online algorithms, combinatorics, probability, and dimension reduction. He has also recently become interested in topics in biology, and particularly RNA splicing.

Regev is an associate editor in chief of the journal Theory of Computing, and is a co-founder and organizer of the TCS+ online seminar series.

References 

Israeli computer scientists
Israeli mathematicians
Israeli cryptographers
New York University
Living people
Tel Aviv University alumni
Gödel Prize laureates
Year of birth missing (living people)
20th-century American mathematicians
21st-century American mathematicians